Daisy the Great is an American indie pop band from Brooklyn led by Kelley Nicole Dugan and Mina Walker. The song "Record Player" from their debut album (a new version of their 2017 debut single "The Record Player Song") was released in August 2021, with additional verses and production performed by AJR. It went to number 6 on the Billboard Alternative Airplay chart.

As of October 2022, they have amassed over 1.1 million monthly streamers on Spotify.

History 
Kelley Nicole Dugan and Mina Walker met as acting majors at NYU's Tisch School of the Arts. Dugan is from New York, and Walker grew up in New Orleans. They formed Daisy the Great in 2016, and released their first EP, I've Got a Few Friends and I Wish They Were Mine, in 2018. They released their debut album, I'm Not Getting Any Taller, in January 2019. The single "Record Player" became a hit on TikTok, accumulating over 270 million views. They released their second EP, Soft Songs, in 2020 and their second album, All You Need Is Time, in 2022.

Daisy the Great has opened for the Happy Fits, Indigo Girls, Sidney Gish, and Samia, and toured with AJR and Half Alive.

Lineup 

 Kelley Nicole Dugan: lead vocalist, keyboards
 Mina Walker: lead vocalist, guitar, bass guitar
 Briana Archer: backup vocalist
 Matt Lau: guitar
 Bernardo Ochoa: guitar, bass guitar
 Matti Dunietz: drums

Discography

Studio albums

Extended plays

Singles

References

External links 
www.daisythegreat.com

American women singer-songwriters
21st-century American singers
21st-century American women singers
Indie pop groups from New York (state)
American indie folk groups